Eulamprotes helotella is a moth of the family Gelechiidae. It is found in Spain, Portugal, France, Italy, Greece, Corsica, Sardinia, and Crete. It is also found in North Africa.

The wingspan is 16–17 mm. The forewings are light fuscous, more or less densely irrorated (speckled) with whitish and darker fuscous and with a cloudy, obscure, dark fuscous, sub-elongate dot in the middle of the disc, and a second before three-fourths. The hindwings are grey.

References

Moths described in 1859
Eulamprotes
Moths of Europe